Ananea District is one of five districts of the San Antonio de Putina Province in Peru.

Geography 
The Apolobamba mountain range traverses the district. Other mountains are listed below:

History 
Ananea District was created on May 2, 1854.

Ethnic groups 
The people in the district are mainly indigenous citizens of Quechua descent. Quechua is the language which the majority of the population (57.88%) learnt to speak in childhood, 36.50% of the residents started speaking using the Spanish language (2007 Peru Census).

Mayors 
 2011–2014: Samuel Ramos Quispe. 
 2007–2010: Crispín Amanqui Rodríguez.

Festivities 
 July: 
 Our Lady of Mount Carmel.
 James, son of Zebedee.

See also 
 Chullpaqucha

References

External links 
 Official web site
 INEI Peru